Thomas or Tom Edmonds may refer to:

Thomas Edmonds (tenor), Australian opera singer
Thomas Rowe Edmonds (1803–1889), English actuary and political economist
Thomas Edmondes (1563–1639), also spelt Edmonds, English diplomat, MP and Treasurer of the Household
Tom Edmonds (media consultant), American  president of the International Association of Political Consultants
Tom Edmonds (footballer) (1878–?), Scottish footballer
Thomas Edmonds (manufacturer) (1858–1932), philanthropist from Christchurch known for his 'Sure to Rise' baking powder and the Edmonds Cookery Book